Walter L. Gordon Jr. (1908-2012) was an American attorney. He was a pioneering African-American attorney in Los Angeles.

He began his career at a time when there were only 30 African-American attorneys practicing in California. He often represented Billie Holiday.

References 

African-American lawyers
Lawyers from Los Angeles
1908 births
2012 deaths
20th-century African-American people
21st-century African-American people